The 2014 Bromley London Borough Council election took place on 22 May 2014. All 60 members of Bromley London Borough Council were elected. The elections took place alongside local elections in the other London boroughs, elections to local authorities across the United Kingdom, and elections to the European Parliament.

In the previous election in 2010, the Conservative Party maintained its control of the council, winning 53 out of the 60 seats with the Liberal Democrats forming the primary opposition with 4 seats, a loss of three. The Labour Party lost a seat, and won the remaining 3 seats.

At this election, The Liberal Democrats lost all four of their seats on to Labour in the Cray Valley East, Crystal Palace and Clock House wards.  UKIP gained two seats from the Conservative Party in Cray Valley West.

Results Summary

Ward Results

Bickley

Biggin Hill

Bromley Common and Keston

Bromley Town

Chelsfield and Pratts Bottom

Chislehurst

Clock House

See also
Bromley Council
2014 London local elections
2014 United Kingdom local elections
2014 European Parliament election in the United Kingdom

References

External links

2014
Bromley